Jimmie Bartell "Bart" LaRue (January 23, 1932 – January 5, 1990) was an American voice actor who performed on many US television shows including Star Trek, Mission: Impossible, The Brady Bunch (Episode 41), and Mannix.

LaRue wrote, directed and produced the film Satan War (1979).

References

External links
 
 

1932 births
1990 deaths
American male screenwriters
American male voice actors
20th-century American male actors
20th-century American male writers
Male actors from Texas
Writers from Texas
People from Foard County, Texas
20th-century American screenwriters